Kayvan (also spelled Kayvon, Keivan, Kaywan, Keywan, Kavon, Kevan, or Kaevon) is a Persian masculine given name meaning Saturn. It is related to the word for Saturn in several old languages, including "Kaimanu" in Sumerian, "Kayamanu" in Akkadian, "Kion" in Syriac, and "Kewan" (kywʾn') in Middle Persian. That a 16th-century high priest of Estakhr was named Azar Kayvan suggests that "Kayvan" was used as a name for a person in Iran as early as that time, particularly among followers of Zoroastrianism. To date "Kayvan" is a popular name among families following Zoroastrianism. "Kayvan" is distinct from the similar Persian word "Kayhan", meaning "universe", also used as a masculine given name.  To English speakers, the spelling Kayvon is closest to the Persian pronunciation, .

"Saturday", the day of Saturn, finds its Classical Persian equivalent in "Keyvansheed".

In Persian literature

IN the name of the Lord of Life and wisdom
To nothing sublimer can thought be applied
The Lord of "Kayvan" and the turning sky
Who causeth Venus, Sun, and Moon to shine.

In the Geocentric model, Saturn was on the highest planetary sphere, the seventh. As a result, in Persian poetry, “Kayvan” usually connotes physical elevation or exalted status. Related to this connotation are compound adjectives of praise such as "Kayvan-manesh" (of lofty nature), “Kayvan-manzelat” (of lofty position), or "Kayvan-jenab" (Kayvan's peer).

The 14th century poet Khajoo Kermani writes to his beloved:

Neither are you one to tend to my tired cries,
Nor am I one to not let them to "Kayvan" rise.

Three centuries earlier, Sanai is doubtful that just any poet can match his own skills:

Reaching “Kayvan", fancies he, with his arrow?
Mere fancy: mere iron is his bow.

Rumi writes:

Drop your business: "horse and cargo".
The cup’s the horse, load the wine.
Into the sky then watch go
High as “Kayvan”, your business, divine.

It is high praise to suggest that Saturn is in one's service.  Khajoo writes:

Brahmin of the world of the six doors, still,
Soaring "Kayvan" is but an agent of our will.

Saturn's other associations appear less frequently.  It is the constable of the heavens.  It appears darker than the inner planets.  In Roman and Greek mythologies, Saturn and its Greek origin Cronus were at times associated with old age.  In astrology, Saturn is the Greater Malefic, the bringer of bad luck.  This last association appears not to affect contemporary Persian-speaking parents' choice of names for their sons.

Khaghani, writing in the 12th century, complains:

By the curses of life, on the seventh sky I landed,
Like “Kayvan”: not one cohort of luck, stranded.

While referring to Saturn's status, Masud Sa'd Salman contrasts old and young and good and bad luck:

This child, though great as old "Kayvan", as all appraise,
The luck of the young, like a governess, will raise.

Putting together another combination, Sa'di compliments his beautiful and possibly tall beloved.  The dark Indian dot on her forehead is likened to the constable Saturn.

On the roof of that house of beauty, your face,
Your Indian “Kayvan” stands guard with grace.

Given name
Kayvan Khalatbari (born 1983), American entrepreneur
Keyvan Jenkins (born 1961), American footballer
Keyvan Shovir (born 1985), Iranian-born American street artist
Kaevon Merriweather (born 1999), American football player
Kayvan Mirhadi (born 1960), Iranian composer
Kayvan Najarian, Iranian scientist
Kayvan Novak (born 1978), British actor
Adrian Kayvan Pasdar (born 1965), American actor and film director
Kayvon Thibodeaux (born 2000), American football player
Kayvon Webster (born 1991), American football player
Kayvon Zand, American musician
, Austrian researcher

Surname
Azar Kayvan (1529–1609), a Zoroastrian high priest of Istakhr

See also
Kiwan in Mandaeism

References

Persian masculine given names
Saturn in culture